Bathiya & Santhush, also known as BNS, are a Sri Lankan pop duo consisting of Bathiya Jayakody (born on December 22, 1976)  and Santhush Weeraman (born on September 5, 1977), who met while at the "Mary Anne David School of Vocal Music" in Colombo (training mainly under the categories of classical and show tunes). They both were born in Colombo, Sri Lanka. They have been one of the most commercially successful music acts in Sri Lanka in the last two decades.

Bathiya Jayakody was educated at Ananda College, Colombo while Santhush Weeraman was educated at Royal College, Colombo. Santhush comes from a musical family, his brother Dushyanth Weeraman is also a popular singer in Sri Lanka.

Since the inception of their act in 1998, they have over 50 number-one hit singles, six platinum selling mainstream albums, four commercially successful EPs and countless movie soundtracks. BNS are one of the biggest musical acts to hit the Sri Lankan musical scene since the 1990s, mixing Sinhala, Tamil, and English rap verses in their originals, while they have also mixed Hindi rap verses in their folkhop remixes bringing out their contemporary style and the music industry in Sri Lanka. BNS became the only Sri Lankan hip hop act to feature Indian singers, namely Hariharan (in the song Yaalpanamen), Asha Bhosle (Dedunna Sedi) and Sonu Nigam (in the song Aachale). BNS is also the only Sri Lankan artistes to have albums under both Sony BMG & Universal Music India.

Having performed in over 2000 concerts in Sri Lanka and abroad, BnS marked significant success with their own concert tour series "Neththara Live" with 120 concerts (2005-2008), "Shaheena Live" 40 concerts (2009-2011), "Sarasihina Live" 150 concerts (2011-2014), "BNS Up Close & Personal" 50 Concerts (2015-2018) and their latest concert series "Oba Nisa - Celebrating 20 Years of Music" which was launched in 2019.

Starting from a musical duo from their home during their early days, BnS Currently are the primary share holders of the BNS Production Group which houses some of the most successful companies in the Sri Lankan entertainment industry companies — Showtown Entertainment event management & production, Saregama Music Digital Audio Production, Saregama Films, Saregama Digital Content Acquisition & Management and Leap Strategic Concepts.

Bathiya Jayakody

Early years
Bathiya Jayakody was born to a military family. His father was late Maj. Gen. Nihal Jayakody and mother Mohini Jayakody. His singing abilities come from his mother’s side. His maternal grandmother Somi Singhika Basnayake who hailed from Hillwood College, Kandy, was in the college choir and his mother a classically trained pianist and a piano tutor. Bathiya started classical piano music from the age of seven and continued to excel in music throughout his school career.

Academic career
He started his education in Holloway Primary School in India and upon return in 1984, he entered Isipathana College, Colombo for a brief period. In 1988, he joined Ananda College, Colombo, where he later held the position of Deputy Head Prefect in 1995 and was decorated as a President Scout of the Scout Troop in 1994. After his secondary education at Ananda College, he completed his degree and obtained BSc (Hon) Business from the Manchester Metropolitan University, UK.

Early musical journey
While studying western classical music privately, Bathiya was a member of the first Ananda College Senior Brass Band where he played the alto saxophone and occasionally filled in for the percussion section. He was also a pianist with the western music society. He was a founding member and a lead vocalist of the school band. Winning many awards at inter school competitions, Bathiya soon became a known figure in the school's music circuit as a college musician during the mid-90s. He later started learning the music technology with the Sri Lankan music artist Dilup Gabadamudalige. He also joined the Marry Anne Singers Colombo and studied opera, jazz and Broadway singing under the Mary Anne David School of Vocal Music. During the late 90s, Bathiya worked as a freelance vocalist singing for radio jingles and commercials together with Ranga Dassanayake. During this period, Bathiya Jayakody and Santhush Weeraman collaborated on a few projects, which led to the formation of BnS.

Santhush Weeraman

Early life
Santhush Weeraman was born on the 5th of September, 1977 to Nalaka Weeraman, a retired marketing director at Richard Pieris. 
He is the elder brother of the singer Dushyanth Weeraman.

Academic career
Santhush studied at Royal College, Colombo where he excelled at both music, art, & sports as well as academics. He completed his bachelor's degree, with a double major in Marketing and Management.

Early musical journey
Santhush Weeraman's mother hails from a musical family which influenced his entry to music from a young age.

Television Shows

Awards and accomplishments
 First Sri Lankan artists to secure a Music Publishing Contract under Universal Music Publishing in 2002. 
 First Sri Lankan artists to sign a recording contract with Sony BMG in 2002. 
 Winner - Silver Award, Voice of Asia, Kazakhstan in 2001.
 Winner - Bronze Award, Shanghai Music Festival, China in 2001.
 Composers & Performers of the Official Sri Lankan Cricket Anthem for Sri Lanka Cricket in 2002 - Apa jathiye naamayen.
 Winner - TYOP Award for the contribution to Culture & Arts, Ten Young Outstanding Persons of the year awards (TOYP) 2002. 
 Winner -  Best fusion band, Golden Clef Award in 2002.
 Bronze award - 4th Sunflower Hip hop Music Festival in Zernjanin, Serbia in 2003.
 Special Achievement Award Winners at the "Astana Music Festival" in Kazakhstan in 2005.
 Winner - "Male Icon-2006" Entertainment Industry Award (Ceremony was held on 14 June 2007 at Hilton Colombo.)
 Winner - Most Popular Artist of the Year Award, Sirasa Music Awards in 2007.
 Runners-up - Best Music Video, for Res Vihidena Samanaliyak, Derana Music Video Awards in 2014.
 First Sri Lankan artists to release a song with an Indian collaboration. BnS released a track called "Yaalpaanamen" featuring iconic Indian singer Hariharan in 2013.
 Collaboration with Asha Bhosle on their 5th album "Sara Sihina" which was released in September 2014.
 Runner-up -  Music Video of Lanka Matha, Derana Music Video Awards in 2010.
 Performed at the opening act of the IIFA Awards 2010. BnS was also the co-writers of the IIFA awards 2010 opening music track together with Jananath Warakagoda. 
 Performed at the 2011 ICC Cricket World Cup opening ceremony as ambassadors of folkhop.
 Winner - Award for outstanding contribution to the Sri Lankan Music Industry, Derana Music Video Awards in 2012.
 Composed and Performed of the official theme song for ICC Cricket T20 World Cup Song 2012
 Composed the song "Achale" sung by Indian Pop Idol Sonu Nigam for the Japanese Anime Movie "The Mystical Laws" in 2013.
 Performed and co-directed the official theme song for the Commonwealth Heads of Government Meeting (CHOGM) in 2013.
 Winner of the best VFX music Video at the Derana Music Video Award 2015 for the Music Video "Lassana Desak"
 Winners of the prestigious Ada Derana "Sri Lankan" of the Year 2016 in the Entertainment and Arts Category.

Discography

References

 
 
  
 
 
 
 
 
 
 
 *

External links
BnS official site

Hip hop duos
Sri Lankan musical groups